Signal Corps Radios were U.S. Army military communications components that comprised "sets". Under the Army Nomenclature System, the abbreviation SCR initially designated "Set, Complete Radio", but was later misinterpreted as "Signal Corps Radio."

Nomenclature
The term SCR was part of a nomenclature system developed for the U.S. Signal Corps, used at least as far back as World War I. Three-letter designators beginning with "SC" were used to denote complete systems, while one and two-letter designators (such as "BC", for basic component, "FT" for mounting, etc.) were used for components. Only a few system designators were used:

SCM   Set, Complete, Meteorological
SCR   Set, Complete, Radio
SCS   Set, Complete, System

SCR radio sets
The U.S. Signal Corps used the term "sets" to denote specific groupings of individual components such as transmitters, receivers, power supplies, handsets, cases, and antennas.  SCR radio sets ranged from the relatively small SCR-536 "handie talkie" to high-powered, truck-mounted mobile communications systems like the SCR-299 and large microwave radar systems such as the SCR-584 radar.

SCS
The SCS designator was applied to groups of SCR-numbered sets comprising an extensive system, such as multiple radio sets employed in a ground-based fighter direction/control center.  The SCR designator could be a single transmitting or receiving set, or a full set of both transmitting and receiving equipment.

Additional designators
An additional designator, "RC" was used for subsystems or groups of accessories. The Joint Electronics Type Designation System which came into use in 1943 absorbed or superseded the SC designations.

SCR communication radios by branch use
This is only a general list, quite a few radios crossed over between branches.

Armor
 SCR-78
 SCR-189
 SCR-245
 SCR-508 FM
 SCR-510 FM

Artillery
 SCR-109
 SCR-136
 SCR-161
 SCR-178
 SCR-179 pack
 SCR-194
 SCR-608 FM
 SCR-610 FM
 SCR-619 FM

Infantry
 SCR-77
 SCR-131
 SCR-195
 SCR-284
 SCR-300 FM
 SCR-536
 SCR-694

general use/command
 SCR-50
 SCR-97
 SCR-101
 SCR-105
 SCR-124
 SCR-171
 SCR-177
 SCR-193
 SCR-299
 SCR-506

Cavalry
 SCR-44 mule pack
 SCR-49 mule pack
 SCR-127 mule pack
 SCR-130 mule pack
 SCR-179 mule pack
 SCR-203 mule pack
 SCR-511 pogo stick

Coast artillery/AAA
 SCR-162
 SCR-543

Air Liaison (ground)
 SCR-54
 SCR-108
 SCR-188
 SCR-197
 SCR-237

Aircraft
 SCR-62 observation balloon
 SCR-64
 SCR-68
 SCR-80
 SCR-90
 SCR-91
 SCR-100
 SCR-133
 SCR-134
 SCR-135
 SCR-183
 SCR-187
 SCR-274
 SCR-283
 SCR-287
 SCR-522
 SCR-542

Radar
SCR-268 searchlight and gun control
SCR-270 mobile long range early warning, VHF
SCR-271 fixed long range early warning, VHF
SCR-277 Radio range
SCR-289 improved -270
SCR-527 medium range, VHF
SCR-584 gun control, microwave
SCR-602 mobile, short range early warning
SCR-658 weather balloon tracker
SCR-784 light weight 584

See also

U.S. Signal Corps
Joint Electronics Type Designation System
List of U.S. Signal Corps Vehicles
List of World War II electronic warfare equipment

References

External links
 http://sdr.lib.umich.edu/cgi/pt?id=mdp.39015062770162 signal corps storage catalogue 1920
 https://earlyradiohistory.us/1916sc.htm early systems
 http://www.qsl.net/pe1ngz/army/army-us/us-comm.html

Military radio systems of the United States
World War II American electronics
Military technology
History of radio
Radio electronics